USS Minnesota was a wooden steam frigate in the United States Navy. Launched in 1855 and commissioned eighteen months later, the ship served in east Asia for two years before being decommissioned. She was recommissioned at the outbreak of the American Civil War and returned to service as the flagship of the North Atlantic Blockading Squadron.

During the first day of the Battle of Hampton Roads on 8 March 1862, Minnesota ran aground, and the following battle badly damaged her and inflicted many casualties. On the second day of the battle,  engaged CSS Virginia, allowing tugs to free Minnesota on the morning of 10 March. Minnesota was repaired and returned to duty, and three years later she participated in the Second Battle of Fort Fisher. Minnesota served until 1898, when she was stricken, beached and burnt to recover her metal fittings and to clear her name for a newly-ordered battleship, .

Construction and early duties 

Minnesota was laid down in May 1854 by the Washington Navy Yard in Washington, D.C. She was launched on 1 December 1855, sponsored by Susan L. Mann, and commissioned on 21 May 1857 with Captain Samuel Francis Du Pont in command.

Minnesota was named for the Minnesota River.

Minnesota, carrying William B. Reed, U.S. Minister to China, departed from Norfolk, Virginia, on 1 July 1857 for East Asia. During her service with the East India Squadron, she visited many of the principal ports of China and Japan before departing Hong Kong to bring Reed home with a newly-negotiated commerce treaty, the Treaty of Tianjin, with China. Upon arrival in Boston, Massachusetts, on 2 June 1859, Minnesota was decommissioned at the Boston Navy Yard in Charlestown, Massachusetts, the same day and remained in ordinary until the outbreak of the American Civil War in April 1861.

Civil War 
Minnesota was recommissioned on 2 May 1861, Captain G. J. Van Brunt in command, and became flagship of the Atlantic Blockading Squadron, commanded by Flag Officer Silas Stringham. She arrived at Hampton Roads, Virginia, on 13 May and the next day captured the schooners Mary Willis, Delaware Farmer, and Emily Ann. Minnesota took the bark Winfred on the 25th and the bark Sally McGee on 26 June. Schooner Sally Mears became her prize 1 July and bark Mary Warick struck her colors to the steam frigate on the 10th.

Minnesota led a joint Army-Navy expedition, known as the Battle of Hatteras Inlet Batteries, against two important Confederate forts which had been erected at Hatteras Inlet, North Carolina. The squadron opened fire on Fort Clark on the morning of 28 August 1861, forcing the Confederate gunners to abandon the fort at noon. The following day, the fire of the squadron was concentrated on Fort Hatteras. The bombardment was so effective the Confederates were compelled to seek cover in bomb shelters and surrendered.

When Flag Officer Louis M. Goldsborough relieved Stringham in command of the North Atlantic Blockading Squadron on 23 September, he selected Minnesota as his flagship.  William B. Cushing, later to distinguish himself for sinking the Confederate ironclad CSS Albemarle, was assigned as a junior officer to the Minnesota.

Battle of Hampton Roads 
While blockading off Hampton Roads, 8 March 1862, Minnesota sighted three Confederate ships, Jamestown, Patrick Henry, and Virginia—the former Merrimack, rebuilt and protected by iron plates—rounding Sewell's Point and heading toward Newport News, Virginia. Minnesota slipped her cables and got underway to engage the southern warships in a fight that would come to be known as the Battle of Hampton Roads. When about 1.5 miles from Newport News, Minnesota grounded.

Meanwhile, Virginia passed frigate  and rammed and sank sloop-of-war . Virginia then engaged Congress compelling her to surrender and setting her alight. Then Virginia, Jamestown, and Patrick Henry bombarded Minnesota killing and wounding several of her crew before the Union warship's heavy guns drove them off. Minnesota also fired upon Virginia with her pivot gun. Toward twilight the Southern ironclad withdrew toward Norfolk.

The recoil from her broadside guns forced Minnesota further upon the mud bank. All night tugs worked to haul her off, but to no avail. However, during the night  arrived. "All on board felt we had a friend that would stand by us in our hour of trial," wrote Captain Gershom Jacques Van Brunt, the vessel's commander, in his official report the day after the engagement. Early the next morning Virginia reappeared. As the range closed, Monitor, steaming between Minnesota and the iron-clad, fired gun after gun, and Virginia returned fire with whole broadsides, neither with much apparent effect. Virginia, finding she could not hurt Monitor, turned her attention to Minnesota, who answered with all guns. Virginia fired from her rifled bow gun a shell which passed through the chief engineer's stateroom, through the engineers' mess room, amidships, and burst in the boatswain's room, exploding two charges of powder, starting a fire which was promptly extinguished.

At midday Virginia withdrew toward Norfolk, and the Union Navy resumed its efforts to refloat Minnesota. Early the next morning steamer S. R. Spaulding and several tugs managed to refloat the frigate, and she anchored opposite Fort Monroe for temporary repairs.

Seven African-American sailors manned the forward gun of the vessel. This black crew mustered in at Boston, Massachusetts, and included William Brown, Charles Johnson, George Moore, George H. Roberts, George Sales, William H. White and Henry Williams.

During the two-day engagement, Minnesota shot off 78 rounds of 10-inch solid shot; 67 rounds of 10-inch solid shot with 15-second fuse; 169 rounds of 9-inch solid shot; 180 9-inch shells with 15-second fuse; 35 8-inch shells with 15-second fuse and 5,567.5 pounds of service powder.

Battles of Fort Fisher
For the next few years she served as flagship of the North Atlantic Blockading Squadron. While anchored off Newport News on 9 April 1864, Minnesota was attacked by Confederate torpedo boat Squib, which exploded a torpedo charge alongside without causing damage and escaped.

On 24 and 25 December, Minnesota took part in amphibious operations at Fort Fisher which guarded Wilmington, North Carolina (the First Battle of Fort Fisher). During the landings she took a position about a mile from the fort and laid down a devastating barrage on the Confederate stronghold. However, General Benjamin F. Butler withdrew his troops, nullifying the gains won by the joint Army-Navy effort. Three weeks later the Union Navy returned Federal Troops, now commanded by the more vigorous General Alfred Terry, to Fort Fisher (the Second Battle of Fort Fisher). A landing force of 240 men from Minnesota, covered by a barrage from their own ship, participated in the successful assault. This operation closed Wilmington, denying the Confederacy the use of this invaluable port.

During the Second Battle of Fort Fisher, nine sailors and Marines from the Minnesota earned the Medal of Honor as part of the landing party which assaulted the fort. The nine men were:
 Landsman Gurdon H. Barter
 Seaman David L. Bass
 Ordinary Seaman Thomas Connor
 Ordinary Seaman Thomas Harcourt
 Seaman Charles Mills
 Corporal John Rannahan
 Private John Shivers
 Private Henry A. Thompson
 Ordinary Seaman Franklin L. Wilcox

Prizes

Later service 
Ordered to Portsmouth, New Hampshire, Minnesota was decommissioned on 16 February 1865. She was recommissioned on 3 June 1867 and made a cruise with midshipmen to Europe. She was placed in ordinary at the New York Navy Yard on 13 January 1868. Recommissioned on 12 June 1875, she remained at the New York Navy Yard as a gunnery and training ship for naval apprentices.

In 1881 she was transferred to Newport, Rhode Island where she served as the flagship of the US Navy Training Squadron.  From 1881 to 1884 she was commanded by Captain Stephen Luce who founded the Naval War College in 1884.  The warship took part in dedication ceremonies for the Brooklyn Bridge on 24 May 1883.

Three sailors assigned to Minnesota were awarded the Medal of Honor during this period: Captain of the Top William Lowell Hill and Ship's Cook Adam Weissel for rescuing fellow sailors from drowning in separate 1881 incidents, and Second Class Boy John Lucy for his actions during a fire at the Castle Garden immigration facility in 1876.

In October 1895, Minnesota was loaned to the Massachusetts Naval Militia, continuing that duty until August 1901 when she was sold to Thomas Butler & Company of Boston. She eventually was burned to salvage her iron fittings at Eastport, Maine.

See also

List of steam frigates of the United States Navy
List of naval ships named for Minnesota
Bibliography of early American naval history
Union Navy

References

• Silverstone, Paul H. Warships of the Civil War Navies Naval Institute Press, Annapolis, MD, 1989, .

Ships built in the District of Columbia
Ships of the Union Navy
Gunboats of the United States Navy
American Civil War patrol vessels of the United States
Sailing frigates of the United States Navy
Minnesota in the American Civil War
Steamships of the United States Navy
Steam frigates
1855 ships
Maritime incidents in March 1862